Pathfinder Partners (Pathfinder) is a private equity real estate investment firm based in San Diego, California. Founded by Lorne Polger and Mitch Siegler in 2006, Pathfinder has made more than 120 investments and realized successful exits on more than 100 core, value-add, opportunistic and distressed properties. The firm now specializes in income-generating multifamily properties in six mid-tier cities in the western U.S. and has $750 million in assets under management. Since inception, Pathfinder has acquired property, defaulted loans, and bank real estate-owned ("REO") with estimated invested capital exceeding $1 billion.

Pathfinder's primary target markets are in economically resilient metro areas in the western U.S., including  Seattle, Portland, Sacramento, San Diego, Phoenix and Denver.  Pathfinder takes both a top-down (macro-economic) view and a bottoms-up (fundamental, property-level) approach to underwriting every investment. Accredited investors may participate in Pathfinder's diversified investment funds. Currently, Pathfinder is investing through Pathfinder Income Fund, L.P., an open-ended, diversified multifamily fund launched in 2020.

Portfolio
Pathfinder's Investment Portfolio

Publications
The Pathfinder Report

External links
Pathfinder Partners, LLC (company website)

Financial services companies established in 2006
Private equity firms of the United States
Companies based in San Diego